Events in the year 2016 in Sweden.

Incumbents
Monarch – Carl XVI Gustaf
Prime minister – Stefan Löfven

Events
 2016 Sweden riots

Television
 2016 in Swedish television

Sport
 Sweden at the 2016 Summer Olympics
 Sweden at the 2016 Summer Paralympics

August 20 to 27 – the 2016 World Orienteering Championships were held in Strömstad and Tanum.

Music
 Sweden in the Eurovision Song Contest 2016

Crime
 2016 Sweden terrorism plot
 Killing of Alexandra Mezher
 2016 social unrest in Sweden

Births
 March 2 – Prince Oscar, Duke of Skåne

Deaths
 11 January – Gunnel Vallquist (b. 1918).
 17 January
 Carina Jaarnek (b. 1962).
 Kjell Alinge (b. 1943).
 25 January – Alexandra Mezher
 30 January – Calle Wisborg (b. 1969).
 5 February – Bodil Malmsten (b. 1944).
 29 February – Josefin Nilsson (b. 1969).
 30 June – Martin Lundström, Olympic cross country skier (b. 1918).
 23 July – Thorbjörn Fälldin (b. 1926).
 17 September – Sigge Parling, footballer (b. 1930).

References

 
Years of the 21st century in Sweden
Sweden
Sweden
2010s in Sweden